Robert "Bob" Bertrand (April 4, 1953 – May 17, 2022) was a Canadian politician. He was born in Fort-Coulonge, Quebec.

Bertrand was a federal member of Parliament for the riding of Pontiac—Gatineau—Labelle.  He ran and won in the 1993, 1997 and 2000 Canadian federal elections with significant majorities under the banner of the Liberal Party of Canada.  Although considered a backbencher, he was very active in Parliament, participating in several standing committees including primarily National Defence and Veterans Affairs; working to study and improve the poor quality of life for members of the Canadian Forces and their families.  He also served as Parliamentary Secretary for the Minister of National Defence from 1998 to 2000.

Lost nomination in 2004

Although prepared to run in the 2004 federal election, he lost the Liberal party candidate nomination to an unknown at the time, David Smith.  This was due to new party nomination rules put in place by Paul Martin that changed the long-standing policy of selecting the incumbent by acclamation, part of the infighting that was present within the party at the time.  Many rural party members (who traditionally supported Bertrand) felt disenfranchised by this defeat because of the new party nomination rules which called for 3 polling locations spread out across the riding (Fort-Coulonge, Wakefield and Maniwaki) instead of the traditional 1 neutral polling site for both candidates.  They believed this favoured the Maniwaki area party members (most of whom supported Smith) because of the greater concentration in their numbers in conjunction with their polling location.

Attempt to run as a Liberal candidate in the 40th Canadian federal election 

An article in The Hill Times indicated that Robert Bertrand wished to run as a Liberal candidate in the upcoming federal election.  His original request to run was refused in March 2007 and the nomination was closed, giving the candidacy instead to Cindy Duncan-McMillan in order to "meet the party’s target of 33 per cent female candidates".  On April 4, Bertrand received a call from the current director of the Liberal Party of Canada in Quebec, Serge Marcil, telling him that the candidacy was re-opened, however he was given an impossible deadline of one week to collect memberships and present himself as a candidate.  Bertrand refused this offer and the nomination went ahead with Duncan-McMillan winning over Ottawa lawyer Richard Mahoney on April 15, 2007.

Later life and death

He lived in Fort-Coulonge with his wife Sandra where he operated a small business and had three children.

In October 2016, Robert Bertrand was elected as the National Chief of the Congress of Aboriginal Peoples. Bertrand died in Shawville, Quebec on May 17, 2022, aged 69.

Electoral record

References

External links
 

1953 births
2022 deaths
Members of the House of Commons of Canada from Quebec
Liberal Party of Canada MPs
French Quebecers
21st-century Canadian politicians
People from Outaouais